Irina Nikolayevna Vorobieva (30 June 1958 – 12 April 2022) was a Russian pair skater who competed for the Soviet Union. With her then-husband Igor Lisovsky, she was the 1981 World champion and the 1981 European champion. They were coached by Tamara Moskvina.

Before teaming up with Lisovsky, she competed with Aleksandr Vlasov, with whom she was the 1977 World silver medalist, 1976 World bronze medalist, and placed 4th at the 1976 Olympics.

Most recently, she worked as a coach at the World Arena in Colorado Springs, Colorado. Among her students were Brittany Vise and Nicholas Kole, Tiffany Vise and Derek Trent, and Shelby Lyons and Brian Wells.

Programs 

(with Lisovsky)

Competitive highlights

With Vlasov 

1974 Spartakiada results used for Soviet Nationals

With Lisovsky

References 

 
 New York Times: Soviet Streak in Pairs Ended by East Germans
 Pairs on Ice: Vorobieva & Lisovsky 
 Pairs on Ice: Vorobieva & Vlasov 
 Skatabase: 1976 Olympics
 Skatabase: 1980s Worlds
 Skatabase: 1980s Europeans

External links 

 World Arena Coaching Biography

1958 births
2022 deaths
Russian female pair skaters
Soviet female pair skaters
Figure skaters at the 1976 Winter Olympics
Olympic figure skaters of the Soviet Union
Figure skaters from Saint Petersburg
World Figure Skating Championships medalists
European Figure Skating Championships medalists